Hohenbrunn is a municipality in the district of Munich in Bavaria, Germany.

It is located in the southeast of Munich, occupying an area of 16.82 km². It connects to the Bundesautobahn 99 with its own exit, BAS Hohenbrunn. As of 30 June 2014, the population was 8,726.

History
Early settlements existed around springs from 500 to 800 AD. The first written remark about Hohenbrunn is dated to the year 780 AD by Tassilo III of Bavaria.

References

External links
 http://www.hohenbrunn.de Hohenbrunn Website 

Munich (district)